The 2019 Old Dominion Monarchs football team represented Old Dominion University in the 2019 NCAA Division I FBS football season. The Monarchs played their home games at S.B. Ballard Stadium in Norfolk, Virginia and competed in the East Division of Conference USA (CUSA). They were led by eleventh-year head coach Bobby Wilder.

Preseason

CUSA media poll
Conference USA released their preseason media poll on July 16, 2019, with the Monarchs predicted to finish in sixth place in the East Division.

Preseason All–Conference USA teams
The Monarchs were the only team in the East Division, that had no players selected to the preseason All−Conference USA teams.

Schedule
Old Dominion announced its 2019 football schedule on January 10, 2019. The 2019 schedule consists of 6 home and away games in the regular season.

Schedule Source:

Personnel

Coaching staff
Staff for 2019 season.

Game summaries

Norfolk State

at Virginia Tech

at Virginia

East Carolina

Western Kentucky

at Marshall

at UAB

Florida Atlantic

at FIU

UTSA

at Middle Tennessee

Charlotte

References

Old Dominion
Old Dominion Monarchs football seasons
Old Dominion Monarchs football